The Starship album contains the songs from the musical of the same name produced by StarKid Productions, with music and lyrics by Darren Criss, and book by Matt Lang, Nick Lang, Brian Holden, and Joe Walker. It was recorded by the musical's cast and was released digitally on April 30, 2011 through iTunes and Amazon.com. The album debuted at No. 134 on Billboard 200 and No. 1 for Top Cast Albums. The album also reached No. 4 on iTunes.

Track listing

Personnel

Featured Performers

Credits
 Jack Stratton – producer, mixer, drums, percussion, keyboards, synthesizers, bass guitar, guitar
 Clark Baxtresser – piano
 Darren Criss – guitar

Chart performance

References

External links
 StarKid Productions official website
 Star Kid Productions on YouTube

StarKid Productions albums
Cast recordings
Theatre soundtracks
2011 soundtrack albums